Captain Love may refer to:

Harry Love (lawman)
Captain Love, 1907 novel by Theodore Goodridge Roberts
Captain Love (album), by Mock Orange
"Captain Love", song by The Winery Dogs from Hot Streak (album)
Captain Love  (ja), 1999 video game voiced by Jōji Yanami and others